Pepsi Raw was a cola soft drink created by PepsiCo and Britvic exclusively introduced in the United Kingdom in 2008 as a "Sparkling Cola Drink with Natural Plant Extracts". Pepsi Raw contained naturally sourced ingredients that were free from artificial flavouring, colourings, preservatives and sweeteners. Advertising for Pepsi Raw presented the product as a natural alternative to other colas. Pepsi Raw was also marketed in Norway and Australia.

In the United States and Mexico a similar product was being marketed under the name Pepsi Natural.

In September 2010, it was announced that Pepsi Raw was to be withdrawn from the UK market.

Ingredients

Sparkling water.
Cane sugar.
Apple extract.
Colour: plain caramel.
Natural plant extracts (including natural caffeine and kola nut extract).
citric, tartaric and lactic acids.
Stabilizer: gum arabic.
Thickener: xanthan gum.

Nutritional information

Nutritional information per 300ml bottle:

Energy (Kcal): 117
Protein (g): 0
Carbohydrates (g): 29.7
Of which Sugars (g): 28.8
Fat (g): 0
Saturates (g): 0
Fibre (g): 0
Sodium (g): Trace

Nutritional Information per 100ml:

Energy (Kcal): 39
Protein (g): 0
Carbohydrates (g): 9.9
Of which Sugars (g): 9.6
Fat (g): 0
Saturates (g): 0
Fibre (g): 0
Sodium (g): Trace

Availability and packaging

Pepsi Raw was sold in the United Kingdom across the following outlets: ASDA, Sainsbury's, Somerfield, Morrison's, Tesco, All Bar One, Selfridges, Harvey Nichols, Waitrose, Boots, WHSmith and Superdrug.

It was sold individually in 300ml glass bottles, 150 ml cans and 250ml cans.  It was also available in four-bottle and four-can multipacks.

Pepsi Natural was sold in the United States at these outlets: Target (Minnesota, California and Pennsylvania), Costco, Ralphs, Albertsons and Woodmans.

Pepsi Natural was marketed in parts of the US in an 8 fl oz (237 ml) and a 12 fl oz (355 ml) glass bottle.

Currently, Pepsi Natural is not sold in the US.  This was due to it not selling as well as Pepsi had hoped and so it was discontinued.  Currently, there are no plans to reintroduce the product.

In July 2010 Pepsi Raw was introduced in Norway. It was sold individually in 1.5l, 0.5l and 0.3l bottles. As of May 2011 Pepsi Raw is no longer available in Norway.

As of February 2011 Pepsi Raw is now available in Australia in 250mL cans, being sold exclusively at 7-11. The product is imported from the UK.

Marketing
To help promote Pepsi Raw, an experiential marketing campaign dubbed "Natural Born Cola" was launched. Promotional workers traveled to grocery retail, shopping malls, train stations, offices and via roaming hit squads in key cities nationwide. During the 6 week campaign 1,295,500 bottles of Pepsi Raw were distributed with 82% of consumers saying they liked the taste and a further 75% claiming they would go on to buy it.

See also
 List of defunct consumer brands

References

 http://www.timesonline.co.uk/tol/life_and_style/food_and_drink/article3353735.ece 
 http://pepsiproductfacts.com/infobyproduct.php?prod_size=12&brand_fam_id=1051&brand_id=1000&product=Pepsi+Natural

External links
 Official UK Pepsi Raw site

PepsiCo cola brands
Products introduced in 2008
Discontinued soft drinks